The National Electronic Distributors Association (NEDA) was a trade association in the United States of manufacturers and distributors.

The association cooperates in standardization of names for components, such as batteries. NEDA is often cited by American manufacturers, along with ANSI, for names of components.

NEDA merged with the Electronic Industries Alliance in 2010 to form the Electronic Components Industry Association (ECIA).

References

Trade associations based in the United States
Mass media companies
1981 establishments in the United States
2010 disestablishments in the United States